Ryosuke Maeda may refer to:
 Ryosuke Maeda (footballer, born 1994), Japanese footballer
 Ryosuke Maeda (footballer, born 1998), Japanese footballer